Tolleshunt may refer to the following places in Essex, England:

Tolleshunt D'Arcy
Tolleshunt Knights
Tolleshunt Major